The 2011 Belarusian Super Cup was held on 27 February 2011 between the 2010 Belarusian Premier League champions and 2009–10 Belarusian Cup winners BATE Borisov and the 2009–10 Belarusian Cup runners-up Torpedo-BelAZ Zhodino. BATE won the match 3–0 and defeated the trophy.

Match details

See also
2010 Belarusian Premier League
2009–10 Belarusian Cup

References

Belarusian Super Cup
Super
Belarusian Super Cup 2011